Hacıselli (also, Gadzhiselli and Gadzhyselli) is a village and municipality in the Yevlakh Rayon of Azerbaijan. It has a population of 1,363. The municipality consists of the villages of Hacıselli and Marzığı.

References 

Populated places in Yevlakh District